ARB (an abbreviation from Azerbaijani Republic Broadcaster, formerly Region TV) is a private television station in Azerbaijan. It is tenth nationwide public channel. The channel is created after merger by Azerbaijan's regional channels, which includes Kapaz TV, RTV, Janub TV, El TV, Kanal-S and Turkel TV.

References

External links
 Official website 

Television networks in Azerbaijan
Azerbaijani-language television stations
Television stations in Azerbaijan
Television channels and stations established in 2014
Azerbaijani companies established in 2014